Ace is the eighteenth studio album by German band Scooter released on 5 February 2016 through Sheffield Tunes & Kontor Records, preceded by the first single "Riot" on 4 September 2015, and the second single "Oi" was released on 5 February 2016. They both peaked in Hungary at No.16 and 19 respectively. The third single "Mary Got No Lamb" was released on 6 May 2016.

Track listing

Personnel
 H.P. Baxxter (MC aka Ace)
 Phil Speiser (musical bases, post-production)
 Michael Simon (co-author)
 Vasiliki Karagiorgos (track 6)
 Michael Maidwell (track 9 & 12)
 Martin Weiland (cover design)
 Jaap Reesema (track 5)

Charts

Release history

Notes
 "Mary Got No Lamb" contains lyrics from the 1976's song "Arms of Mary" by Sutherland Brothers and Quiver.
 "The Birdwatcher" is based on the melody of "The Second Waltz" ("Russian Waltz") by Dmitri Shostakovich and samples main melody from the track "Airport" by Photographer.
 "Torch" is Scooter's version of the 1982's eponymous song by Soft Cell.
 Czech/Slovak and Australian releases of the album by Universal Music and Central Station Records have special design with the titles "Scooter" and "Ace" written in pink letters on both Digipak and booklet.

References

External links
 Scooter - "Riot" video on YouTube
 Scooter - "Oi" video on YouTube
 Scooter - "Mary Got No Lamb" video on YouTube

2016 albums
Scooter (band) albums